Tabriak, also known as Karawari or Yokoim, is one of the Lower Sepik languages of Papua New Guinea. It is spoken in 9 villages near Chambri in Karawari Rural LLG, East Sepik Province.

A Tabriak Talking Dictionary was produced by Living Tongues Institute for Endangered Languages.

See also
Yimas-Karawari Pidgin

References

Lower Sepik languages
Languages of East Sepik Province